Live in Houston may refer to:

Live in Houston 1981: The Escape Tour DVD/CD by Journey 2005
Live in Houston (Louis C.K. album)
Live In Houston, album by  Johnny Winter
Live In Houston, album by Velvet Revolver